Pot River Pass is a mountain pass situated in the Eastern Cape province of South Africa, on the regional road R396, between Maclear, Eastern Cape and Barkly East.

Mountain passes of the Eastern Cape